Inesperado is the sixth studio album by Mexican singer Anahí, released on June 3, 2016, by Universal Music, her first album in seven years.

Singles
"Rumba" is the lead single and was released via iTunes on July 24, 2015. The music video was filmed in Miami on July 18 and premiered on August 28, 2015.
"Boom Cha" was selected as the official second single, the song was released on December 11, 2015.
"Eres" is the third single from the album. It was released digitally on February 12, 2016.
"Amnesia" is the fourth single from the album. It was released digitally on May 27, 2016.

Promo singles
Prior to the release of the album, two promotional singles were released exclusively on Apple's iTunes Store as a "Countdown to Inesperado".

 "Están Ahí" was the first promotional single, released on May 25, 2015.
 "Siempre Tú" was the second promotional single, released on May 20, 2016.

Charts

Track listing

See also
2016 in Latin music

References

External links
Anahí's official website

2016 albums
Anahí albums
Universal Music Latino albums
Spanish-language albums